Lips is a New Zealand-based music group consisting of New Zealander singer and keyboardist Steph Brown, and American multi-instrumentalist/producer Fen Ikner, founded by Brown in 2010 in New York City.  Lips is visually represented by the character of "Lips," a girl with giant lips for a head, who appears in their cover art and music videos. The band has released three EPs, one LP, and produced the 2016 soundtrack of the stage play Daffodils, which they performed in and served as music directors, as well as the OST for the 2019 film version of the play. The band’s song "Everything to Me" won them the 2012 Silver Scroll Award.

In 2019, Brown and Ikner served as music directors, and provided the score for, the movie Daffodils, an adaptation of a stage play of the same name, for which they had also arranged and performed the music.

History 
Lips began as a music project of New Zealander musician Steph Brown in 2010. Brown, who had previously played keyboards for other New Zealand-based artists such as Opensouls and Anika Moa, was living in New York City at the time and playing in an R&B duo called Fredericks Brown, along with singer Deva Mahal.  She began Lips as a side project, playing around New York City both solo and with various Lips lineups.

In 2012, Brown met West Virginia-born musician Fen Ikner, who had previously played with bands such as Calexico, Seashell Radio, Saint Maybe, and The Shondes. Ikner became the permanent live drummer, contributing production and other instruments to the group's recorded output.

"Everything to Me" 
In 2012, the band released the song "Everything to Me" as part of their EP Look Listen. The song spawned several remixes by acts including Adventure Club, SATL, and Christian Strobe. The song won the band the APRA Silver Scroll songwriting award in 2012.

Daffodils 
In 2014, Lips arranged and performed the music for the musical stage play Daffodils, which was  produced by the New Zealand based theatre production company Bullet Heart Club and written by Rochelle Bright. Brown starred in the play as a fictionalised version of Bright, telling the story of her parents along with her band (composed of Ikner and guitarist Abe Kunin). The story weaves together underscore, dialogue, and re-imagined versions of classic New Zealand pop anthems.

The band went to New Zealand for the initial two-week run of the play at Auckland's Q Theatre. The band then went on tour with the play for two years, performing the show in New Zealand, Australia, and eventually taking the production to the Edinburgh Fringe Festival in 2016. The Daffodils soundtrack  EP was released in February 2016.

The stage play was adapted into a feature film, also called Daffodils, for which the band served as the musical directors. Lips wrote three new songs for the film, and provided the soundtrack for the film. The film stars Rose McIver and George Mason, and singer Kimbra taking on the role that Brown originated in the stage production, with Brown and Ikner playing her band. The film was released on 21 March 2019. Brown and Ikner were nominated for an APRA Screen Award for Best Original Music in a Feature Film.

Discography

Releases 
 Lipssongs EP (2010)
 Look/Listen EP (2012)
 Ghosts and Demons EP (2013)
 Daffodils soundtrack (2016)
 Daffodils OST (2019)
 I Don't Know Why I Do Anything (2021)

Singles 
 "Everything to Me" (2012)
 "Traces of Teddy" (2015)
 "This is Me" w/ Zeds Dead (2016)
 "Silent Treatment" w/ Kimbra (2019)
 "Guilty Talk" (2019)

References 

New Zealand indie pop groups
Musical groups established in 2010